Flynn is a suburb of the town of Alice Springs, in the Northern Territory, Australia.

The suburb is named after the Very Reverend John Flynn, the founder of the Royal Flying Doctor Service of Australia and the place where his grave is located.

References

Suburbs of Alice Springs